The Neta N01 (哪吒N01) is an electric subcompact crossover produced by Hozon Auto under the Neta (Nezha) brand, a Chinese all-electric car marque. It was manufactured by the Zhejiang Hezhong New Energy Automobile Company.

Overview

The Neta N01 was launched in 2018.

 

The price of the Neta N01 ranged from 66,800 to 139,800 yuan at launch.

References

External links 

 

2010s cars
Cars introduced in 2018
Front-wheel-drive vehicles
Mini sport utility vehicles
Production electric cars
Crossover sport utility vehicles